Caloptilia pachyspila is a moth of the family Gracillariidae. It is known from Uganda.

References

Endemic fauna of Uganda
pachyspila
Insects of Uganda
Moths of Africa
Moths described in 1965